The Order of Amarante, or Amarante Order (French: La frairie d'Amarante; Swedish: Amaranterorden), was a fraternal order of Swedish knights, founded in 1653 by Queen Christina of Sweden at Epiphany. The Order was established in honor and memory of her meetings with the Spanish ambassador Antonio Pimentel de Prado, who originated from Amarante, Portugal. He was also the first to receive the award. The Order was limited to 15 knights, who had to remain unmarried.

Order members were those "who participated in the Queen's most intimate pleasures." Among the original members were (besides the Spanish ambassador) the French ambassador Pierre Chanut, Venetian ambassador Francesco Morosini, Denmark's national steward Corfitz Ulfeldt, Poland's crown chancellor Hieronim Radziejowski, chamberlain Christoph Delphicus zu Dohna, Jacob De la Gardie, Magnus Gabriel De la Gardie and Clas Tott (1630–1674). The Order was also awarded to Władysław IV Vasa, Elector John George of Saxony, and Frederick, Landgrave of Hesse-Eschwege.

The members of the Order had to take part in a supper on Saturday evening at Jacobsdal, called the "Feast of the Gods" in the happy Arcadia. Ulfeldt was god Jupiter, Pimentel was dressed as a war god Mars and Radziejowski as Bacchus into the hall on a barrel with a large vinstop in hand. There were fourteen dancing couples on the first evening.

In 1656, the Order was dissolved. In July 1760, the Order of the Amarant was revived again in Stockholm, Sweden by Claes Qvist. The Order holds its ceremony and ball in Stockholm at Grand Hotel every even year since mid of the 19th century.

"Amaranth" derives from Greek  (amarantos), "unfading," with the Greek word for "flower," ἄνθος (anthos), factoring into the word's development as "amaranth." The more accurate "amarant" is an archaic variant.

References

 www.amaranterorden.se

Sources
 C. G. U. Scheffer, Stora amaranterordens historia (1942).

1653 establishments in Sweden
Organizations established in the 1650s
Orders, decorations, and medals of Sweden
Fraternal orders
Christina, Queen of Sweden